Hare Force is a 1944 Warner Bros. cartoon in the Merrie Melodies series, directed by Friz Freleng. The cartoon was released on July 22, 1944, and stars Bugs Bunny.

Plot
On a cold and snowy night, Bugs wangles his way into the good graces and – more importantly – the house of an old lady (voiced by Bea Benaderet). Sylvester, her dog (voiced by writer Tedd Pierce), takes an instant dislike to the Bunny, and most of the cartoon is spent with the two tricking each other into going outside the house and getting locked out. Finally they get into a schtick where they are each throwing the other out the front door, in quick succession. The old lady, fed up with all the bickering by now, intervenes and tells them both to get out, when suddenly she is thrown out, startled and indignant. Bugs and the dog have made peace, and are lazing by the fire. Bugs turns to the viewer and says "Gee, ain't I a stinker?"

Production notes
Although the title is an obvious play on Air Force, the plot of Hare Force has nothing to do with the military. "As Time Goes By" is sung in this short by Sylvester the dog (not to be confused with Sylvester the cat) and Bugs at different points.

Hare Force is the first short that uses the refined design of Bugs Bunny outside of a Bob Clampett directed cartoon, though it was slightly tweaked by Freleng in this short.

The story is similar in concept to Hiss and Make Up (1943) where Granny warns her constantly feuding pets that she would throw them out into the snow if she hears any more noise.

Home media
Hare Force is available on Looney Tunes Golden Collection: Volume 3. It can also be found on the Bugs Bunny: Hollywood Legend VHS, the "Starring Bugs Bunny" VHS, the "Looney Tunes Collectors Edition: Canine Corps" VHS from Columbia House, and the "Bugs Bunny Classics" laser disc.

Sources

See also
List of American films of 1944

References

External links
 

1944 films
1944 short films
1944 animated films
1940s animated short films
Short films directed by Friz Freleng
Films about pets
Merrie Melodies short films
Warner Bros. Cartoons animated short films
Films produced by Leon Schlesinger
Films scored by Carl Stalling
Animated films about dogs
Bugs Bunny films
1940s Warner Bros. animated short films